The following lists events that happened during 2022 in East Africa. The countries listed are those described in the United Nations geoscheme for East Africa: 
 Burundi,  Comoros,  Djibouti,  Eritrea,  Ethiopia,  Kenya,  Madagascar,  Malawi,  Mauritius,  Mayotte,  Mozambique,  Réunion,  Rwanda,  Seychelles,  Somalia,  South Sudan,  Tanzania, Uganda,  Zambia,  Zimbabwe.

Incumbents

Burundi 

 Chief of state and Head of government: President Évariste Ndayishimiye, (since 2020).
 First Vice President: Gaston Sindimwo (since 2015)
 Second Vice President: Joseph Butore (since 2015)

Comoros 

 Chief of state and Head of government: President Azali Assoumani (since 2016)

Comoros also claims the island of Mayotte.

Djibouti 

 Chief of state: President Ismail Omar Guelleh (since 1999)
 Head of government: Prime Minister Abdoulkader Kamil Mohamed (since 2013)

Eritrea 

 Chief of state and Head of government: President Isaias Afwerki (since 1993)

Ethiopia 

 Chief of state: President Sahle-Work Zewde (since 2018)
 Head of government: Prime Minister Abiy Ahmed (since 2018)
 Deputy Prime Minister Demeke Mekonnen (since 2012)

Kenya 

 Chief of state and Head of government: President Uhuru Kenyatta (since 2013)
 Deputy President: William Ruto (since 2013)

Madagascar 

 Chief of state: President Andry Rajoelina (since 2019)
 Head of government: Prime Minister Christian Ntsay (since 2018)

Malawi 

 Chief of state and Head of government: President Lazarus Chakwera (starting 2020)
 Vice-President Saulos Chilima (since 2020)

Mauritius 

 Chief of state: President Prithvirajsing Roopun (since 2019)
 Head of government: Prime Minister Pravind Jugnauth (since 2017)

Mauritius claims sovereignty over the Chagos Archipelago (including Diego Garcia), although this claim is disputed by the UK.

Mayotte 

 Mayotte is an overseas department and region of France.

 Chief of state: President of France Emmanuel Macron (since 2017)
 Head of government: Prime Minister of France Édouard Philippe (since 2017)
 President of the Departmental Council Soibahadine Ibrahim Ramadani (since 2015)

Mayotte is an overseas department and region of France also claimed by Comoros.

Mozambique 

 Chief of state: President Filipe Nyusi (since 2015)
 Head of government: Prime Minister Carlos Agostinho do Rosário (since 2015)

Réunion 

 Réunion is an overseas department and region of France.

 Chief of state: President Emmanuel Macron (since 2017)
 Head of government: Prime Minister of France: Jean Castex (since 2020)
 President of the Regional Council: Huguette Bello (since 2021)

Rwanda 

 Chief of state: President Paul Kagame (since 2000)
 Head of government: Prime Minister Édouard Ngirente (since 2017)

Seychelles 

 Chief of state and Head of government: President Wavel Ramkalawan (starting 2020).
 Vice-President: Ahmed Afif (starting October 26, 2020)

Somalia 

 Chief of state: President Mohamed Abdullahi Mohamed (since 2017)
 Head of government: Prime Minister> Mohamed Hussein Roble (starting 2020)

Somaliland 

The Republic of Somaliland Is a De facto independent state that declared independence from Somalia in 1991.

 Chief of state and head of government: President Muse Bihi Abdi
 Vice President: Abdirahman Saylici
 Speaker of the House: Bashe Mohamed Farah
 Chairman of Elders: Suleiman Mohamoud Adan
 Chief Justice: Adan Haji Ali

South Sudan 

 Chief of state and Head of government: President Salva Kiir Mayardit (since 2011)
 First Vice-President Taban Deng Gai (since 2016)
 Second Vice President James Wani Igga (since 2016)

Tanzania 

 Chief of state and Head of government: President: Samia Suluhu (since 2021)
 Vice-President: Philip Mpango (since 2021)
 Head of government: Prime Minister: Kassim Majaliwa (since 2015)

Uganda 

 Chief of state: President, Yoweri Museveni (since 1988)
 Vice President: Edward Ssekandi (since 2011)
 Head of government: Prime Minister Ruhakana Rugunda (since 2014)
 First Deputy Prime Minister: Moses Ali (since 2016)
 Second Deputy Prime Minister Kirunda Kivenjinja (since 2016)

Zambia 

 Chief of state and Head of government: President, Hakainde Hichilema (since 2021)
 Vice-President Mutale Nalumango (since 2021)

Zimbabwe 

 Chief of state: President Emmerson Mnangagwa (since 2017)
 Vice-President: Constantino Chiwenga (since 2017)

Events 

Ongoing – Afar–Somali clashes, COVID-19 pandemic in Africa, Gedeo–Oromo clashes, Metekel conflict, Oromo–Somali clashes, Puntland-Somaliland dispute, Somali Civil War, Tigray War

Scheduled Events

Elections 
 August 9 – 2022 Kenyan general election
 June 20 – Rwandan 2022 Commonwealth Heads of Government Meeting
 November 26 – 2022 Somaliland presidential election

Unknown date 
 2022 Somali presidential election

Holidays

January and February 

 January 1 – New Year's Day, (Gregorian calendar)
 January 7 – Orthodox Christmas, Public holidays in Eritrea and Public holidays in Ethiopia
 January 12 – Zanzibar Revolution Day, Public holidays in Tanzania.
 January 15 – John Chilembwe Day, Public holidays in Malawi.
 January 26 – National Resistance Movement Day, Public holidays in Uganda.
 January 28 – Thaipusam, Public holidays and festivals in Mauritius (Tamil Hindu holiday).
 February 1 – Heroes' Day, Public holidays in Rwanda.
 February 3 – Heroes' Day, Public holidays in Mozambique.
 February 16 – Janani Luwum Day, Uganda.
 February 22 – Robert Mugabe National Youth Day, Public holidays in Zimbabwe.

March and April 

 March 2 – Victory at Adwa Day, Ethiopia.
 March 3 – Martyrs' Day, Malawi.
 March 8 – International Women's Day.
 March 11 – Isra and Mi'raj, Public holidays in Djibouti, the Prophet's Night Journey.
 March 12
 National Day, Mauritius.
 Youth Day, Public holidays in Zambia.
 March 18 – Cheikh Al Maarouf Day, Public holidays in the Comoros
 March 29 – Martyrs' Day, Public holidays in Madagascar.
 April 1–3 – Maundy Thursday, Good Friday, Holy Saturday
 April 5 – Easter Monday
 April 7 – Abeid Karume Day, Tanzania.
 April 19 – Independence Day, Zimbabwe.
 April 26 – Union Day, Tanzania.

May and June 

 May 1 – Labour Day or International Workers' Day
 May 5 – Patriots' Victory Day, Ethiopia.
 May 13 – Eid al-Fitr, Muslim feast of breaking of the Fast.
 May 16 – Sudan People's Liberation Army Day, Public holidays in South Sudan.
 May 24 – Independence Day (Eritrea)
 May 25 – Africa Day
 June 1 – Madaraka Day, Public holidays in Kenya.
 June 18 – Constitution Day, Public holidays in Seychelles.
 June 20 – Martyrs' Day (Eritrea)
 June 25 – Independence Day, Mozambique.
 June 26
 Independence Day, Madagascar.
 Independence Day, Public holidays in Somalia.
 June 27 – Independence Day, Djibouti.
 June 29 – Independence Day, Seychelles.

July and August 

 July 1
 Independence Day, Public holiday in Burundi (since 1962)
 Independence Day, Rwanda (since 1962).
 Republic Day, Somalia.
 July 4 – Liberation Day (Rwanda).
 July 5 – Heroes' Day, Zambia.
 July 6
 National Day, Comoros.
 Independence Day, Malawi.
 July 20 – Eid al-Adha, holiest Islamic feast of the year.
 July 30 – Martyrs' Day, South Sudan.
 August 8 – Nane Nane Day, Tanzania.
 August 15 – Assumption of Mary, Roman Catholic feast in the Seychelles.

September and October 

 September 7 – Victory Day, Mozambique.
 October 9 – Independence Day, Uganda.
 October 11 – Huduma Day, Kenya.
 October 18 – Day of Prayer, Zambia.
 October 25 – Independence Day, Zambia.

November and December 

 November 2 – Indian Arrival Day, Mauritius.
 November 12 – Maore Day, Comoros
 December 9 – Independence Day, Tanzania.
 December 13 – Jamhuri Day, Kenya.
 December 22 – Unity Day, Zimbabwe.
 December 25 – Christmas Day, Western Christian holiday
 December 26 – Boxing Day (Utamaduni Day in Kenya)

Sports

Deaths

January 
 January 2
 Charles Njonjo, 101, Attorney General of Kenya from 1963 to 1979, pneumonia
 Richard Leakey, 77, Kenyan paleoanthropologist and conservationist, unspecified death

March 
 March 3 – Abune Merkorios, 83, fourth Patriarch of the Ethiopian Orthodox Tewahedo Church, unspecified death
 March 11 – Rupiah Banda, 85, 4th President of Zambia, colon cancer
 March 12 – Karl Offmann, 81, 3rd President of Mauritius, unspecified death
 March 23
 Amina Mohamed Abdi, 40, Somali politician, victim of March 2022 Somalia attacks
 Hassan Dhuhul, unknown age, Somali politician, victim of March 2022 Somalia attacks

April 
 April 21 – Mwai Kibaki, 90, 3rd President of Kenya, unspecified death

See also 

 2021–22 South-West Indian Ocean cyclone season
 2022–23 South-West Indian Ocean cyclone season
 2022 in Middle Africa
 2022 in North Africa
 2022 in Southern Africa
 2022 in West Africa
 2020s
 2020s in political history
 Grand Ethiopian Renaissance Dam
 African Union
 Common Market for Eastern and Southern Africa
 International Organisation of La Francophonie (OIF)
 East African Community
 Southern African Development Community
 Community of Sahel–Saharan States
 War in Darfur
 Tigray War

References 

East Africa
Events in Africa
2022 in African sport